Lyme was a 52-gun third rate  frigate built for the navy of the Commonwealth of England at Portsmouth, and launched in 1654.

After the Restoration in 1660 she was renamed HMS Montagu in honour of Edward Montagu, 1st Baron Montagu of Boughton, who died in 1644 after being imprisoned for supporting King Charles I. She was widened in 1675 and underwent her first rebuild in 1698 at Woolwich Dockyard as a 60-gun fourth rate ship of the line. Her second rebuild took place at Portsmouth Dockyard, from where she was relaunched on 26 July 1716 as a 60-gun fourth rate to the 1706 Establishment.

The Montagu was broken up in 1749.

Notes

References

Lavery, Brian (2003) The Ship of the Line - Volume 1: The development of the battlefleet 1650-1850. Conway Maritime Press. .

Ships of the line of the Royal Navy
1650s ships
Speaker-class ships of the line